Malásia is the twelfth album by Brazilian singer and songwriter Djavan released in 1996.

The album opens with the song "O Que foi My Love?", a jazz accelerated ending in the form of blues; "Sêca", which talks about the drought in northeastern jungle; "Nem Um Dia" biggest hit of the album on the radio FM to come to the soundtrack of the telenovela "Por Amor" in 1997, "Não Deu", where as a songwriter Djavan embodies the feminine soul to compose the song, "Deixa O Sol Sair", which is based on samba, "Tenha Calma" which had already been made for over a decade, and performed by Maria Bethânia, and "Não Deu", another with a self-lyrical female. The last three songs are cover versions or versions of other songs: "Coração Leviano" is a remake of a successful samba composer Paulinho da Viola, "Sorri (Smile)" is a remake of the song "Smile" by Charlie Chaplin, and "Correnteza" is a remake of a song by Tom Jobim, Luiz Bonfá partnered with.

Track listing
Que Foi My Love? (Djavan)
Seca (Djavan)
Nem um dia... (Djavan)
Não Deu... (Djavan)
Deixa o sol sair (Djavan)
Tenha calma (Djavan)
Irmã de Neon (Djavan)
Cordilheira (Djavan)
Malásia (Djavan)
Coração Leviano (Paulinho da Viola)
Sorri (Smile) (Charles Chaplin/Geoffrey Parsons/John Turner/Version: João de Barro)
Correnteza (Tom Jobim/Luiz Bonfá)

Credits
Fingerprint Recorded in the studio (RJ) May–August 1996
 Wizards Studio: Marco Hoffer, Hoffer Marcelo (load), Mark Vicente
 Musical Production Assistant: Paul Calasans
 Assistant coach: Geraldo Tavares
 Cover and Graphic Coordination: Carlos Nunes
 Photos: Milton Montenegro
 Recording Engineer: Rudy Gama, Enrico De Paoli
 Mixing Engineer: Enrico De Paoli
 Mastering: Ricardo Garcia
 Production and Fittings: Djavan
 Executive Producer: Mara Rabello

Musicians
 Drums: Carlos Bala
 Bass Arthur Maia
 Flute saxophone Soprano Sax Tenor Sax: Marcelo Martins
 Percussion: Armando Marçal
 Piano and keyboard s: Djavan
 Trumpet Walmir Gil
 Violin: Mariana Isdebski; Rick Amado
 Viola: Jairo Diniz
 Guitar Thumper and Vocal Djavan

Djavan albums
1996 albums